Burmese pythons (Python bivittatus) are native to Southeast Asia. However, since the end of the 20th century, they have become an established breeding population in South Florida. The earliest python sightings in Florida date back to the 1930s and although Burmese pythons were first sighted in Everglades National Park in the 1990s, they were not officially recognized as a reproducing population until 2000. Since then, the number of python sightings has exponentially increased with over 30000 sightings from 2008 to 2010.

Burmese pythons prey on a wide variety of birds, mammals, and crocodilian species occupying the Everglades. Pronounced declines in several mammalian species have coincided spatially and temporally with the proliferation of pythons in South Florida, indicating the already devastating impacts upon native animals. Although the low detectability of pythons makes population estimates difficult, most researchers propose that at least 1 million pythons likely occupy South Florida. The importation of Burmese pythons was banned in the United States in January 2012 by the U.S. Department of the Interior.

Invasive impact

Burmese pythons in the state of Florida are classified as an invasive species. They disrupt the ecosystem by preying on native species, outcompeting native species for food or other resources, and/or disrupting the physical nature of the environment. They are comparable in size or even larger than adult native snake species and quickly reach sizes that reduce their vulnerability to predation. The native American alligator (Alligator mississippiensis) is known to be both the prey, predator and competitor of the serpent, depending upon size of individuals. Bobcats (Lynx rufus) have also been observed raiding python nests for eggs. 

The high reproductive potential, rapid sexual development, and longevity of Burmese pythons clarify why controlling the population through removal of individuals would be difficult. A typical female breeds every other year, produces a clutch of between twenty and fifty eggs, and can live for twenty years or more.

Additionally, as apex predators and dietary generalists, Burmese pythons target a wide array of taxonomic groups. Thus, they are not dependent upon a specific prey species. The flexible dietary requirements of Burmese pythons enable them to survive for long periods of time without food, but when prey is readily available, they will eat regularly. Consequently, Burmese pythons pose a great threat to wildlife, especially mid-sized mammals.

Severe declines in mammalian populations across the Everglades may be tied to the proliferation of pythons. Comparisons of road surveys conducted in 1996-1997 (prior to proliferation) and 2003-2011 (after proliferation) indicated declines from 88% to 100% in the frequency of raccoon, opossum, bobcat, rabbit, fox, and other mammalian species sightings. These declines were concordant with the spatial geography of python spread. Most of these species are well known to have increased in numbers following human disturbance, however.

Smaller declines were observed where pythons were only recently documented and the greatest mammalian abundances were observed outside of the python's current range. Burmese pythons were the dominant predator of reintroduced marsh rabbits (Sylvilagus palustris) in Everglades National Park, and predation by pythons extirpated the rabbit population in less than 11 months. The overall extent to which the greatly reduced mammalian populations will disrupt the complex food web of the Everglades by indirectly affecting other native species, however, is unclear.

In the Everglades

The Everglades is a region of tropical wetlands comprising the lower third of the Florida peninsula. Only 25% of the original Everglades remains, protected within Everglades National Park (ENP). The climate of South Florida and the location of the Everglades, surrounded by a metropolitan area to the east, Naples to the west, and Florida Bay to the south, make it particularly vulnerable to infestations of exotic species. Miami, in particular, is the hub for trade in exotic pets within the United States. Although the exact origin of Burmese pythons in the Everglades is unknown, it is likely that many were once pets released by owners who found them too difficult to care for. However, the majority of experts concur that the python population grew particularly after Hurricane Andrew. The category 5 storm destroyed a python breeding facility, which released numerous snakes into the adjacent swamps. An evaluation of the genetic structure of Burmese pythons sampled from Everglades National Park determined that the population is genetically distinct from pythons sampled in their native range, but within the Everglades population, there is little genetic diversity. 

In 2001, the United States Geological Survey began a 10-year period analysis of 400 pythons captured in the Everglades. The survey discovered that there existed a tangled genetic tree between these captured snakes, and that hybrid pythons were manifesting within the Everglades.13 out of the 400 pythons analyzed had genetic signatures of the Indian rock python within their DNA.  Indian rock pythons are a smaller and faster species than the Burmese python.

Estimating the population of Burmese pythons in the Everglades is challenging because of the secretive nature of this species and the limited ability to conduct traditional mark-recapture assessments. Namely, it is counterintuitive to the primary goal of python removal to return captured pythons to the wild.

Furthermore, the low detectability of pythons means that even if mark-recapture studies could be conducted, they would require a greater research effort than is currently possible. Pythons spend a majority of their day in hiding, whether in burrows or aquatic habitats, and one study indicated that even seasoned herpetologists showed only a 1% efficacy in detecting pythons housed in a seminatural environment. Consequently, estimates of python populations range from at least 30,000 to more than 300,000.

Spatial ecology
Several attempts have been made at better understanding the spatial ecology of Burmese pythons in the Everglades, including capture analysis and radiotelemetry studies. Since the recognition of the breeding population of pythons, researchers have made an effort to note the capture history (date, location, and time) as well as characteristics (mass, length, sex, reproduction condition, and gut contents) of each animal to better characterize the python's activity patterns, spread, and ecology. Gut analyses indicate that captured pythons consume nearly any bird, mammal, or alligator found in the Everglades, including nationally endangered Key Largo woodrats (Neotoma floridana smalli) and wood storks (Mycteria americana).
 
Radiotelemetry includes the use of small, surgically implanted radiotransmitters to track the movement patterns of captured and released animals over extended periods of time. A 2014 study suggests that Burmese pythons have navigational map and compass senses. In contrast to previous research that documented the poor navigational abilities of terrestrial snakes, the movement behavior of the Burmese python seems to be nonrandom. The movements of twelve adult Burmese pythons in Everglades National Park were tracked after they were translocated from their initial locations. Five of the six snakes that were displaced  from their capture sites displayed oriented movement by returning to within  of their original location. This homing ability of the Burmese python is therefore an additional factor that must be considered in predictions of the future range of the python within the southern US and the management of the current population within South Florida.

They have carried Raillietiella orientalis (a pentastome parasitic disease) with them from SE Asia. Other reptiles in Florida have become infested and the parasite appears to have become endemic.

Risk assessment
One of the most contentious issues related to the Burmese python population in Florida is the potential spread to other areas of the southern United States. A potential limitation to a species's habitat range is climate. In February 2008, USGS scientists published a projected range map for the US, based on average climate data of the snake's home range and global warming projections, which predicted that by the end of the 21st century, these snakes could migrate to and flourish in as much as a third of the continental United States, including all three coasts. Numerous climate matching models have indicated that most of Florida and vast portions of the coast of the rest of Southeastern United States provide hospitable habitats for Burmese pythons. The original model takes into account only the fundamental climate space of the python and thus disregards other factors that could limit python spread. Furthermore, most of the data set was obtained from localities outside of the Burmese python's native range.

However, a subsequent study produced a map incorporating both climatic extremes and averages which projected that the Burmese python's range as limited to southern Florida and extreme south Texas, though this projection was criticized in an unsigned Axcess News article as not having been peer-reviewed. Burmese pythons kept throughout winter in an experimental enclosure in South Carolina all died during the study, apparently because they could not properly acclimate to the cold, but most survived extended periods at temperatures below those typical of southern Florida. The report concluded, "Regarding areas of putative suitability and potential expansion within the United States, we find, remarkably, that the area in which the snakes are known to have colonized (south Florida) is essentially the only region where the climatic conditions are suitable for the pythons. Almost no potential for further continental expansion is predicted based on the results from the ecological niche models".

In contrast to the 2009 proposal, the more conservative niche model identifies regions of suitable climate in South Florida, extreme southern Texas, and spotty areas across the Central and Southern Americas. However, the use of this model has been criticized for the overfitting of data from excess variables and the misidentification of four Blood pythons as Burmese pythons. A model corrected for these miscalculations showed a greater projected range of Burmese python climate match including nearly all of Florida, much of the lower Coastal Plain of the southeast United States, and southern Texas.

A severe freeze in the southeastern United States during January 2010 provided additional insight into the threat of Burmese python range extension. In the wake of this extended cold spell, several investigators reported dead snakes coiled along canal banks and in outdoor enclosures. However, numerous snakes survived this cold spell, potentially by using behavioral mechanisms (such as seeking refuge underground). If these behavioral traits are heritable, it is possible that the winter of 2009-2010 served as a selection event for more cold-tolerant pythons. This selected population of pythons would have an enhanced ability to spread northwards and extend the python's invasive range. In addition to behavioral traits, a study in 2018 showed that the surviving pythons showed evidence of: directional selection in genomic regions enriched for genes associated with thermosensation, behavior, and physiology...several of these genes are linked to regenerative organ growth, an adaptive response that modulates organ size and function with feeding and fasting in pythons.If these traits continue to be passed on then they would enable pythons to continue digestion during colder periods of time, which would be useful in geographic regions further north. 

Data published in 2012 contradict the initial USGS study which claimed that non-native Burmese pythons could expand as far north as the southern third of the United States. The Burmese python will remain in the Everglades. Furthermore, other reputable herpetologists have commented on the controversial theory positing future migration past the Florida Everglades. The National Geographic Society's resident herpetologist, Dr. Brady Barr, said, "Climate data reveal that temperatures found in southern Florida simply are not conducive to the long-term survival of large tropical snakes. When it gets cold, these snakes die." Dr. Barr also said "Feral hogs are a bigger problem for the Everglades than pythons. The press has sensationalized this story to the point that people think the sky is falling. Hopefully, comprehensive research such as Jacobson et al. will put an end to the hysteria."

Control
Several methods have been proposed to control the thriving Burmese python population in Florida because much of the python's introduced range includes areas inaccessible to humans. Unfortunately, all strategies proposed thus far have resulted in only limited success. For example, numerous people have suggested using dogs to detect pythons. A 2011 assessment of detection dogs as a mode of python removal determined that the success of a dog search team (73%) was not significantly greater when compared to human search teams (69%) in controlled plot searches. Thick vegetation, which can both reduce visibility and hold odors, limited the efficacy of both human and dog searchers within the plots. However, the dog search team was significantly more successful in canal searches (92%) and was capable of covering three times the distance of human searchers. Despite the potential of dog search teams to detect free-ranging pythons, several impracticalities prevent the widespread use of dog search teams, including the danger posed to released dogs in the Everglades, limited efficacy of chemoreceptive cues in the shallow waters of the Everglades, and extensive limestone substrate that would hinder movement. The greater cost of a dog search team as compared to human searchers is an additional consideration. In the second week of December 2020, this program had its first success.

The Burmese python system also poses challenges to trapping efforts. Trapping, a traditional method of snake capture, can include both the use of a device with an inescapable funnel and a drift fence that directs snake movement towards the trap. It is crucial that drift fences are inserted several inches into the ground in order to ensure that snakes cannot bypass them, but the hard limestone foundation of the area would make the construction of adequate drift fences difficult. Additionally, a python moves infrequently because of its predation habits and thus is less likely to crawl into a trap. Finally, the immense area occupied by the Burmese python undermines the utility of extensive trapping. Trapping could be practical on a smaller scale if critical areas were targeted.

Biocontrol, or biological control, of pythons, has also been proposed by several scientists, likely because of the low detectability of pythons. Traditionally, biocontrols use a virus, parasite, or a bacterium that is selective to the target species in order to reduce the population's size. If the pathogen is not species-specific, it could harm other species. Given that biocontrol methods present a nontrivial and somewhat unpredictable risk to the area's delicate ecosystem, additional research and careful deliberation are necessary before such techniques are used. One of the possible ways of biocontrol is reintroduction of native predators. For example, jaguars had lived in Florida during the Pleistocene, but became  locally extinct. These big cats can kill and eat large snakes (their diet in South America includes anacondas).

Beyond the scientific community, the use of bounty hunters has received a great deal of support from officials and the media, but results have been disappointing. The 2013 Python Challenge, a month-long event with cash incentives for python captures sponsored by the Florida Fish and Wildlife Conservation Commission, resulted in only 68 total python captures by 1,600 registered participants. Another hunt was nonetheless held in 2016, resulting in 106 pythons captured by over 1,000 participants.

Some participants in the state-sponsored hunts have had snakeskin products made from the carcasses, but hunting the animals for food is not recommended, as many top level predators of the Everglades have dangerously high levels of mercury through bioaccumulation, the pythons being no exception. Environmental chemist Dr. David Krabbenhoft of the U.S. Geological Survey tested tissue samples from a collection of frozen python tails maintained by scientists at Everglades National Park. Analysis of more than 50 samples yielded up to 3.5 ppm of mercury. The state of Florida considers fish containing more than 1.5 ppm of mercury unsafe to eat. However  the FWC is studying mercury levels again in order to make recommendations about what size, age, and location of origin might be safe to eat. The eggs are edible.

In July 2020 the South Florida Water Management District and the Florida Fish and Wildlife Conservation Commission announced that the 5000th python had been removed from the Everglades.

Legislation 
While an effective and practical control method for South Florida's Burmese python population has yet to be proposed, regulatory measures are in place to prevent its further spread. Recently, Florida legislators have also put into place provisions targeted at the release of exotic snakes into the wild. Specifically, in 2008 the Florida Fish and Wildlife Commission instituted regulations requiring permits for boas and pythons greater than 2 in. in diameter as well as PIT tags implanted in the snake's skin for identification purposes. This measure aims to prevent the introduction of snake species such as the Burmese python to other regions beyond South Florida. Further, the United States Department of the Interior placed four additional species of snakes, including the Burmese python, under the Lacey Act provisions. According to these provisions, importation of Burmese pythons to the United States is illegal as of January 2012.

See also
Invasive species in the United States
List of invasive species in the Everglades
List of invasive species in Florida
List of invasive plant species in Florida
List of invasive marine fish in Florida

References

Luscombe, Richard. “Florida Hunters Capture More than 80 Giant Snakes in Python Bowl.” The Guardian, Guardian News and Media, 30 Jan. 2020, www.theguardian.com/us-news/2020/jan/30/florida-python-bowl-challenge-capture-snakes.

External links
 Removing Pythons in Florida , Florida Fish and Wildlife Conservation Commission 
 PBS Nature Video: Invasion of the Giant Pythons
Tracking the Big Snakes Devouring the Everglades: Interview with Michael Dorcas
Invasive Snakes
 Burmese python (Python molurus) - EDDMapS State Distribution - EDDMapS

Invasive species in Florida
Invasive animal species in the United States
Everglades
Feral animals
Natural history of Florida
Python (genus)
Reptiles of the United States
Snakes of North America